La Chaux is the name or part of the name of several places:

 in France
 La Chaux, Doubs, a commune
 La Chaux, Orne, a commune
 La Chaux, Saône-et-Loire, a commune
 La Chaux-du-Dombief, a commune in the Jura département
 La Chaux-en-Bresse, a commune in the Jura département

 in Switzerland
 La Chaux (Cossonay), a commune in the canton of Vaud
 La Chaux (Sainte-Croix), a town in the commune of Sainte-Croix (Vaud)
 La Chaux-de-Fonds, a commune in the canton of Neuchâtel
 La Chaux-des-Breuleux, a commune in the canton of Jura
 La Chaux-du Milieu, a commune in the canton of Neuchâtel
 La Chaux (Verbier), an area of the Verbier skiing area

See also
 Chaux (disambiguation)